The North Western Gas Board was a state-owned utility area gas board providing gas for light and heat to industries and homes in the north-west of England.

It was established on 1 May 1949 under the terms of the Gas Act 1948, and dissolved in 1973 when it became a region of the newly formed British Gas Corporation, British Gas North Western, as a result of the Gas Act 1972.

References

Citations

Bibliography

Government agencies established in 1949
Government agencies disestablished in 1973
1949 establishments in England
1973 disestablishments in England
Former nationalised industries of the United Kingdom
Oil and gas companies of England
Utilities of England
Governance of England